Golden Tours is a British open top bus and coach tour operator based in Alperton, London.

History

 
Golden Tours was established in 1984, initially operating airport transfers and day trips from London to tourist destinations across the United Kingdom, such as Stonehenge and the Roman Baths. In 2001, Golden Tours acquired the business of Frames Rickards, which included the London franchise for Gray Line.

In June 2011, Golden Tours began operating open top bus services within Central London. This operation was further expanded out to York in July 2020, with open top services operated in partnership with York Pullman, and later to Windsor in December 2020. In June 2021, Golden Tours entered a partnership with Yellow Coaches to operate open top services in Bournemouth.

Golden Tours became the preferred partner of Warner Bros. Studio Tour London in early 2012, offering transport to and from the studio tour to Bournemouth by coach and to central London by bus.

Incidents
A Golden Tours sightseeing bus with 40 passengers occupying the top deck crashed into a tree on Woburn Place in August 2015, injuring four passengers including Polish national Ireneusz Luszczewski, who had his ear partially severed in the crash. It was later found that the crash had occurred when the driver of the bus took both hands off the steering wheel to consult a map. Golden Tours admitted 95% liability prior to a court hearing and was in line to pay damages to Luszczewski.

Fleet
Golden Tours' London operations are based out of a depot in Alperton, which was opened in July 2013.

As of November 2019, the Golden Tours fleet consisted of 67 buses and coaches: 39 open top double-decker vehicles, consisting of Optare Visionaire and MCV DD103 bodied Volvo B9TLs, 19 coaches and 9 closed top double deckers. Eight closed top tri-axle MCV EvoSetis on Volvo B8L chassis were acquired for Warner Bros. Studio Tour work in 2020.

References

External links

Gray Line Worldwide
London bus operators
1984 establishments in England